Isauro Gabaldón y González (born Isauro González; December 8, 1875 – December 21, 1942) was a resident commissioner of the Philippines to the United States House of Representatives, serving from 1920 until 1928.

Early life
Gabaldón was born in San Isidro, Nueva Ecija, Captaincy General of the Philippines (present-day Philippines) on December 8, 1875, and was a Spanish Filipino, the son of José Gabaldón y Pérez, a Spaniard from Tébar, Cuenca, and of María González y Mendoza, a Filipina native. He was the grandson by paternal side of Lorenzo Gabaldón and Luisa Pérez, and by maternal side of Cosme González and Bárbara Mendoza.

Education and law practice
Gabaldón attended the public schools in Tebar, Spain, which was his father's hometown. He studied law at the Universidad Central in Madrid, Spain and graduated from the Univérsidad de Santo Tomas in Manila, Philippines. He practiced law from 1903 to 1906.

Political career
Gabaldón served as governor of the province of Nueva Ecija in 1906 and from 1912 to 1916. He was a member of the Philippine Assembly from 1907 to 1912. He later served in the Philippine Senate between 1916 and 1919. He was elected as a Nationalist and a resident commissioner to the United States in 1920. He was reelected in 1923 and 1925, and served from March 4, 1920, until his resignation effective July 16, 1928, having been nominated for election to the Philippine House of Representatives. He had also been elected in 1925 as a member of the Philippine House of Representatives, but did not qualify, preferring to continue as commissioner until resigning in 1928.

Death
Gabaldón died on December 21, 1942.

Legacy
Gabaldón lends his name to American-era public elementary schools built through the bills he sponsored thru the Philippines Assembly Act No. 1801 or "the Gabaldon Law" of 1907.

See also
Gabaldon School Buildings
List of Asian Americans and Pacific Islands Americans in the United States Congress
List of Hispanic Americans in the United States Congress
Resident Commissioner of the Philippines

Notes

References

External links

1875 births
1942 deaths
Filipino people of Spanish descent
Complutense University of Madrid alumni
Members of the House of Representatives of the Philippines from Nueva Ecija
Members of the United States Congress of Filipino descent
Nacionalista Party politicians
People from Nueva Ecija
People from Santa Mesa
Resident Commissioners of the Philippines
Hispanic and Latino American members of the United States Congress
Senators of the 4th Philippine Legislature
University of Santo Tomas alumni
Members of the Philippine Legislature
Governors of Nueva Ecija